"Kwarikwa (Remix)" is a song by the Nigerian singer Flavour N'abania. It was released as the lead single from his third studio album,  Blessed (2012). The song features the Congolese singer Fally Ipupa. "Kwarikwa" is a love song with an uptempo beat.

Background and release 
"Kwarikwa (Remix)" was co-written by Fally Ipupa and produced by Masterkraft. The song originally appeared on N'abania's second studio album, Uplifted (2010). N'abania and his management decided to make a remix of "Kwarikwa" after the success of the original song.

Music video
The music video for "Kwarikwa" (Remix) was shot and directed in the United States by Godfather Production. Fally Ipupa's scenes were shot in a studio, while the rest of the video was shot at residential locations. Masterkraft made a cameo appearance in the video.

Controversy surrounding the original version
On August 29, 2012, Nigeria Entertainment Today reported that N'abania was involved in a legal battle with the Ghanaian singing duo Wutah over the alleged theft of "Kwarikwa". According to the article, "Kwarikwa" was a replica of Wutah's single "Kotosa". The duo accused N'abania of stealing their song's rhythm, chorus and tempo.

Track listing
 Digital single

Video release history

References 

Flavour N'abania songs
2012 singles
2012 songs